is a Japanese television drama/comedy series, which premiered on NTV on July 13, 2016, starring Keiko Kitagawa in the lead role. Machi Sangenya is a real-estate salesperson whose motto is "There isn't a house I can't sell."

A one-episode special, aired in 2017. A sequel  aired in 2019. Kazuyoshi Saito wrote  to be the theme song of the sequel.

Cast

Keiko Kitagawa as Machi Sangenya
Asuka Kudo as Seiji Niwano
Yudai Chiba as Satoshi Adachi
Ayako Imoto as Mika Shirasu
Hiroki Suzuki as Daisuke Hachinohe
Yuko Araki as Madoka Murota
Chikara Honda as Takuma Gota
Asami Usuda as Kokoro Tamaki
Zen Kajihara as Makoto Fuse
Tōru Nakamura as Dai Yashiro
Tomie Kataoka as Satomi Handa

References

Japanese drama television series
2016 in Japanese television
2016 Japanese television series debuts
2016 Japanese television series endings
Nippon TV dramas